Committee for the Defense of Prisoners' Rights, also translated as Defending the Rights of Prisoners, is an Iranian NGO dedicated to defending the rights of prisoners in the Islamic Republic of Iran. It was founded by human rights activist Emadeddin Baghi after he was sentenced to prison in 1999 when the Iranian judiciary closed the Khordad newspaper where he worked. According to the Financial Times, the committee has two waged staff, and "survives on membership fees from 65 people, donations and a decision by Grand Ayatollah Hossein Ali Montazeri, (a cleric once designated as successor to Grand Ayatollah Ruhollah Khomeini as supreme leader), that it could accept religious dues."

References

Sources

See also 
Defenders of Human Rights Center
Human rights in Islamic Republic of Iran

Non-profit organisations based in Iran
Human rights organisations based in Iran